Hillsborough station is a planned infill train station in Hillsborough, North Carolina, located on the North Carolina Railroad (NCRR). According to town officials, the station building will have meeting a space, similar to Kannapolis station. When it is completed, Amtrak's Carolinian and Piedmont will serve the station. It will be the nearest Amtrak station to the University of North Carolina at Chapel Hill.

History

Plans originally called for a station near the intersection of Churton Street (old NC 86) and US 70 Business to be completed by 2015 at a cost of $8.9 million. After unanticipated delays between NCRR, Norfolk Southern Railway and the North Carolina Department of Transportation, construction was initially scheduled for 2019–2020 with $7.2 million currently budgeted and a projected cost of $8.4 million. However, after further delays, the Hillsborough town commission signed an interlocal agreement with GoTriangle and NCDOT in April 2020, with construction slated for 2027 on a budget of $8.1 million.

Proposed station layout
The station is planned as a single story,  building, with a covered patio, waiting area, attendant's office and a walkway to a side platform along the tracks. The station will also have an auditorium for public meetings and space for town offices. An elevated greenway is planned, which will pass over the tracks and connect to a future second side platform via elevators. The planned greenway will connect downtown and the Hillsborough Riverwalk to the station, then continue south to Cates Creek Park.  The station building is planned as a sustainable structure, with a green roof, natural lighting and building-integrated photovoltaics.

References

External links
Town of Hillsborough's station planning webpage

Buildings and structures in Orange County, North Carolina
Future Amtrak stations in the United States
Hillsborough, North Carolina
Transportation in Orange County, North Carolina
Railway stations scheduled to open in 2027